is a former Japanese football player.

Playing career
Nishizawa was born in Tokyo on May 10, 1974. He joined Verdy Kawasaki from youth team in 1993. He debuted as center back in 1994 and his opportunity to play increased year by year. In 1997, he moved to Shimizu S-Pulse. He became a regular player as center back. However he lost his regular position in 1999. In 2000, he moved to newly was promoted to J1 League club, Kawasaki Frontale. Although the club finished at bottom place in J1 League, the club won the 2nd place J.League Cup. He played many matches as right defender of three backs defense. In 2001, he moved to Nagoya Grampus Eight. Although he played many matches in 2001, he could hardly play in the match in 2002. In September 2002, he moved to Kashima Antlers. In 2003, he moved to J2 League club Consadole Sapporo. He played many matches for long time. The club won the champions in 2007 and was promoted to J1 League. He retired end of 2008 season.

Club statistics

References

External links

1974 births
Living people
Association football people from Tokyo
Japanese footballers
J1 League players
J2 League players
Tokyo Verdy players
Shimizu S-Pulse players
Kawasaki Frontale players
Nagoya Grampus players
Kashima Antlers players
Hokkaido Consadole Sapporo players
Association football defenders